Leonard Melvin Shockley (1941/1942 – April 10, 1959) was a juvenile executed in the United States on April 10, 1959, for a murder committed when he was under the age of 18. Shockley, a black male, was executed in Maryland in a gas chamber for the murder of shopkeeper Sarah Hearne on January 16, 1958. Shockley (then 16) was involved in the robbery of a small shop in Dorchester County, Maryland. He was accompanied by his older brother, 23-year-old Harold Edward Shockley. Hearne was found stabbed several times in the back and breast, and her throat had been cut. The young culprits were identified by an eyewitness. Leonard was 17 years of age at the time of his execution, making him the last instance of a juvenile being executed in  America. His brother received life in prison but was eventually released.

Background
Leonard Melvin Shockley was 16 at the time of the murder. He lived with his parents and several siblings in the rural, unincorporated community of Omar, Delaware. At one point, the family lived near the unincorporated community of Boxiron, Maryland, but they relocated to Omar. Leonard was close to his brother, Harold Edward Shockley, who was 23 years old at the time of the murder. Harold had a previous conviction of larceny, and just days before the murder, he was released from jail on probation. Leonard had stopped attending school, and he had been unemployed for a few weeks.

Crime
On January 16, 1958, the morning of the murder, Leonard drank "almost a pint of wine." He also stated that he had money and had no real reason to commit the robbery. Leonard and Harold brought their sister with them to drop her off at a friend's house; after leaving her, the two decided to commit a robbery in Boxiron.

Leonard and Harold Shockley drove to a store in Boxiron owned by Sarah Hearne, a 39-year-old mother of three. They arrived at approximately 1:00 PM. Evidence suggests that Harold stayed in the car during the beginning of the crime, while Leonard entered the store with a knife in his waistband. When Hearne approached to serve Leonard, Leonard punched her in the face and proceeded to stab her multiple times in the chest and back. Subsequently, he cut her throat with the knife. During the attack, Harold entered the store and tried to open the cash register; he was unable to take any money because the cash register jammed. Leonard and Harold Shockley then fled the scene and drove away, with Leonard behind the wheel.

During the attack, a witness, a black man named Clarence Bishop, saw Leonard and Harold's car outside of the store and heard a scuffle occurring inside. Bishop left the scene to get help from one of Hearne's neighbors. Bishop and the neighbor called the police and then returned to the scene of the crime. By the time they returned, Hearne had walked from the store to her house 95 feet away, where, in front of her stepfather, George Harris, she died from the injuries sustained in the attack. Harris told police that Hearne staggered back into the house and collapsed immediately. Harris summoned an ambulance, but by the time it arrived, Hearne had already died.

Apprehension
Leonard and Harold returned to their home, where they were arrested at 9:15 PM, about eight hours after the murder. They still had Hearne's blood on them, and their car had blood in it as well. Investigators took them to the police station in Georgetown, Delaware, where they both separately confessed to their involvement in the crime. They submitted statements that only slightly varied from each other. In Leonard's statement, both he and Harold attacked Sarah Hearne; Leonard also confessed to stabbing the victim and cutting her throat. In Harold's confession, he contended that Leonard entered the store while he stayed in the car and waited. When he heard "scrambling" in the store, he went in to investigate and found Leonard on the floor with the victim after having cut her throat; Harold claimed that he then pulled Leonard off of the victim and left the store with him. The two disposed of several pieces of evidence before returning home, including several articles of clothing containing extensive bloodstains from the victim.

Afterwards, both were transferred to Maryland for trial.

Trial and appeals
Leonard and Harold Shockley were granted a change of venue, moving the cases from Worcester County, Maryland,  to Dorcester County. Both brothers underwent mental examinations that confirmed that they were competent to stand trial.

Leonard and Harold were tried separately. Both waived their right to a jury trial, so they were each tried by a three-judge panel. The trials lasted one day each. Leonard was convicted of first-degree murder and robbery on April 7, 1958, and sentenced to death. The next day, April 8, Harold was tried and convicted of aiding and abetting Leonard in robbing and murdering Sarah Hearne, and he received a life sentence.

On January 19, 1959, the Maryland Court of Appeals upheld Leonard Shockley's conviction and death sentence. Harold's life sentence was upheld the same day.

Execution
Leonard Shockley was executed in Maryland's gas chamber on April 10, 1959. The execution began at 10:00 PM, when Shockley was escorted into the gas chamber. Guards sealed the gas chamber at 10:02 PM, and at 10:03, the pill of hydrogen cyanide dropped into a vat of sulfuric acid. Shockley was reported to have died only one minute later, with the prison physician, Dr. Henry W.D. Holljes, pronouncing him dead at 10:04 PM by reading an electrocardiogram attached to Shockley's heart. Shockley's execution made him not only the youngest person executed in Maryland, but also the final person to be executed in the United States while still a juvenile.

See also
 Capital punishment for juveniles in the United States

References

1941 births
1959 deaths
20th-century executions of American people
20th-century executions by Maryland
American people executed for murder
Executed African-American people
Executed children
History of Maryland
Minors convicted of murder
People convicted of murder by Maryland
People from Sussex County, Delaware
Juvenile offenders executed by the United States
Year of birth uncertain
People executed by gas chamber